Shining Life Children's Trust (SLCT), also known as Dylana Jeevanthe Children's Trust, is a UK registered charity "working to improve the lives of disadvantaged children and communities in Sri Lanka".  It is UK registered charity number 1068123 and Sri Lanka registered charity number FL1 4011.

References

External links
 Shining Life Children's Trust

Development charities based in the United Kingdom
Charities based in Buckinghamshire